This is a list of brunch foods and dishes. Brunch is a combination of breakfast and lunch eaten usually during the late morning but it can extend to as late as 2 pm and 8 pm on the East Coast, although some restaurants may extend the hours to a later time. The word is a portmanteau of breakfast and lunch. Brunch originated in England in the late 1800s, served in a buffet style manner, and became popular in the United States in the 1930s.

Brunch foods and dishes

The following foods are often served for brunch.

 Avocado toast
 Bacon
 Bagel – in New York City, the "bagel brunch" was popular circa 1900. The bagel brunch consists of a bagel topped with lox, cream cheese, capers, tomato and red onion.
 Bagel and cream cheese
 Biscuits and gravy
 Blintz
 Bread and toast with butter and jams
 Breakfast sausage
 Brunch casserole – a simple casserole prepared with bread, eggs and bacon
 Cheese
 Chilaquiles
Cinnamon rolls 
 Coffee cake
 Cold cuts
 Crêpe
 Croissant
 David Eyre's pancake
 Dim sum
 Dutch baby pancake
 Egg dishes
 Eggs Benedict
 Eggs bourguignon (Oeufs en meurette)
 Eggs Neptune
 Eggs Sardou
 Fried egg
 Huevos rancheros
 Omelette
 Poached egg
 Scrambled eggs
 English muffin (in a variety of configurations)
 French toast
 Frittata
 Fruit
 Grillades – a common brunch dish in the U.S. state of Louisiana
 Grits – a staple food for breakfast and brunch in the Southern United States
 Ham
 Hash – such as corned beef hash
 Hash browns
 Meeshay
 Muesli
 Muffins 
 Oysters Rockefeller
 Pancake
 Pastry
 Potato
 Potato pancake
 Potatoes O'Brien
 Quiche
 Quick bread
 Roasted meats 
 Salads
 Caesar salad
 Cobb salad
 Poached salmon – may be served cold
 Seafood
 Smoked fish
 Smoked salmon
 Soufflé
 Soups 
 Steak and eggs
 Strata
 Tartines
 Teacake
 Tea sandwich
 Terrine
 Touton
 Tunisian tajine
 Waffle

Gallery

Brunch beverages

The following beverages are often served for brunch.

Alcoholic
 Bloody Mary
 Champagne
Caesar, popular in Canada
 Irish coffee
 Mimosa
 Spritzer
 Frühschoppen (German: "morning pint") – can be various types of beverage
 Bellini
 Screwdriver

Non-alcoholic
 Coffee
 Herbal tea
 Juices 
 Orange juice
 Tea
 Yum cha (Cantonese: "drink tea") – a tea that is typically served along with dim sum
 Sparkling water

See also

 Index of breakfast-related articles
 List of breakfast beverages
 List of breakfast foods
 List of culinary fruits
 List of fruit dishes
 Merienda – a light meal in various countries, usually taken in the afternoon or for brunch
 Second breakfast – a meal eaten after breakfast, but before lunch, it is traditional in Bavaria, Poland, and Hungary

References

Bibliography
  164 pages.

Further reading

External links
 

Brunch
Brunch